This is a list of notable residents and people who have origins in the Comilla District of Bangladesh. This list also includes British Bangladeshis, Bangladeshi Americans, Bangladeshi Canadians, and other non-resident Bengalis who have origins in the Comilla District.

Freedom fighters
 Shib Narayan Das, member of BLF, one of the designers of the first flag of Bangladesh
 Shaheed Dhirendranath Datta (1886–1971), ex-Minister of Law, Language movement activist and Shaheed of 1971
 Lt-Col. Akbar Hussain (1942–2006), veteran freedom fighter, ex-Minister of Mineral Sources (1978), ex-Minister of Forest Preservation (1991), ex-Minister of Inland Water
 AKM Bahauddin Bahar

Politicians
 Khondaker Mostaq Ahmad(1918–1996), ex-President of Bangladesh, ex-Minister and member of Exile Cabinet of Meherpur Government
 Kazi Zafar Ahmed (1939-), member of the presidium of Jatiya Party, ex-Prime Minister (1988), ex-Minister of Education (1986)
 Ghulam Azam (1922–2014), ex Leader of Bangladesh Jamaat-e-Islami; professor; politician; convicted war criminal
 Khandaker Mosharraf Hossain, member of the standing committee of Bangladesh Nationalist Party, ex-Minister of Energy & Mineral Resources (1991) and ex-Minister of Health & Family Welfare (2001)
 Mustafa Kamal (1947-),  politician and cricket official
 Shaukat Mahmood (1959-), senior journalist, editor of Weekly Economic Times, adviser to Begum Khaleda Zia and elected president (2007–08, 2009-incumbent) of National Press Club
 Jehangir Khan Tareen, Pakistani politician of Pakistan Tehreek-e-Insaf, born in Comilla
 Mujibul Haque Mujib, a member of the Bangladesh National Parliament for the constituency of Comilla-11 and is the current Minister for Railways of Bangladesh
Muhammad Hasanuzzaman (1900–1968), member of the Bengal Legislative Assembly

Social activists and philanthropists
 Nawab Faizunnesa, poet, pioneer in women's education, founder of Faizunnesa Girls’ School
 Ayman Sadiq Founder at ten minute school

Educators and scholars
 Fazlul Halim Chowdhury, former vice-chancellor, Dhaka University

Writers
 Buddhadeb Bosu (1908–1974), Bangla poet, novelist, translator, editor and essayist
 Kazi Nazrul Islam, from West Bengal, but resided at Comilla for long
 Abdul Kadir (1906–1984), researcher, poet and editor

Musicians
 Sachin Dev Burman (1906–1975), known as S.D. Burman, singer, composer and music director
 Rahul Dev Burman, known as R.D. Burman, son of S.D. Burman, composer and pioneer in Bollywood music direction
 Alauddin Khan
 Sudhin Das
 Ali Akbar Khan
 Gazi Mazharul Anwar
 Alaka Das, artist of classical music, principal of Sangeet Shikhharthee Sammilan
 Asif Akbar

Actors
 Ferdous Ahmed Bangladeshi actor
 Chinmoy Roy Bengali actor

Scientists
 Harold John Finlay (1901–1951), New Zealand palaeontologist, was born in Comilla

Religious scholars
 Abu Taher Misbah (born 1956), Islamic scholar, academic and textbook author
 Muhammad Abdul Malek (born 1969), Islamic scholar, academic and researcher

See also
 List of Educational Institutions in Comilla

References

External links
 Notable personalities, Welcome to Comilla
 Notable People, "Spreading light 1971"

People from Comilla
Comilla
Comilla
Comilla